Goldschmied is a Swiss - German surname meaning "Gold smith". It may refer to:

Elinor Goldschmied (1910–2009), British educationalist
José Goldschmied
Marco Goldschmied (1944–2022), British architect

See also
 Goldschmid
 Goldschmidt
 Goldschmitt
 Goldsmid
 Goldsmith
 Aurifaber

Surnames
Occupational surnames